The Winnipeg–Churchill train  (formerly known as the Hudson Bay and, before that, Northern Spirits) is a semiweekly passenger train operated by Via Rail between Winnipeg and Churchill, Manitoba. It is the only dry-land connection between Churchill and the rest of Canada.

The service, which runs through Manitoba and Saskatchewan, travels on the Canadian National Railway line north to The Pas, where it transfers to the Hudson Bay Railway, passing through Wabowden, Manitoba, with a spur from Thicket Portage to Thompson, and Gillam on its way to the Port of Churchill on Hudson Bay.

Schedule
The northbound train leaves Winnipeg at 12:05 on Tuesdays and Sundays and is scheduled to arrive in Churchill two days later at 09:00. The southbound service departs Churchill at 19:30 on Thursday and Saturday evenings and reaches Winnipeg at 16:45 two days later. An additional weekly service operates in each direction between The Pas (departure at 02:30 on Fridays) and Churchill (departure at 19:30 on Tuesdays). The trip takes approximately 45 hours each way.

History
An unnamed mixed passenger train connecting with the Winnipeg–Churchill train at The Pas previously served Lynn Lake, but this service was truncated to Pukatawagan in 2003 by the then track owners OmniTRAX citing a loss in freight traffic making the service unprofitable. Via still operates twice weekly service from The Pas to Pukatawagan on behalf of the Keewatin Railway which now owns the Sherridon Subdivision.

2017 flooding 
Service between Gillam and Churchill was suspended on May 23, 2017, when flooding heavily damaged the track bed and bridges. Because supplies had to be flown in by air when train service was suspended, prices skyrocketed in Churchill.

Repairs of the track began on September 8, 2018. By October 31, 2018, the track was repaired, and passenger services resumed with train 693 on December 2.

References

External links
 
  Winnipeg-Churchill train at Via Rail Canada

Passenger rail transport in Manitoba
Passenger rail transport in Saskatchewan
Via Rail routes
Night trains of Canada